Chris Trinidad Flores (born August 31, 1970), known professionally as Big Chris Flores, is an American-Mexican record producer and sound engineer. He first began his music production career in 1999, and in 2002, he founded Moodswing Records. Over the years, Big Chris has been producing music for people such as; Slash, Fergie, K-Ci & JoJo, Layzie Bone, KRS-One, C-Bo, Bun B, Trill OG, Lil Zane, Cedric the Entertainer, and Bone Thugs-n-Harmony.

Early life and career

Chris Trinidad Flores was born on August 31, 1970.
Upon completion of his recording education in 1995, Big Chris went on to become an assistant engineer at Brandon's Way Recording Studio; which is Kenneth "Baby Face" Edmunds private recording studio. Here, Big Chris assisted on a number of recording projects; among them, Babyface, En Vogue, Boyz II Men, Kenny Loggins, Rolling Stones, Az Yet, etc. In 1997, Big Chris went on to become chief sound engineer at King Pin Records, where he engineered for a number of rap groups, including Bone Thugs-n-Harmony, and many other artists that were signed to King Pin Records.

The Rehab Studio

In 1999, Big Chris met Cedric the Entertainer, just prior to Cedric filming the hit movie The Original Kings of Comedy. Upon Cedric's request, Big Chris wrote a reggae/instrumental song named, Peanut Butter, No Jam, which Cedric sings to live in the movie. Soon after the release of The Original Kings of Comedy, Big Chris signed a twelve-song publishing deal with Cedric, which kick started his production career. In 2000-2001 Big Chris scored a documentary video on the life of Cedric The Entertainer, called Life Is A Tour.

In 2002, Big Chris wrote and produced a song for Layzie Bone of Bone Thugs-n-Harmony for the movie Barbershop, starring Ice Cube and Cedric The Entertainer. The same year, Big Chris recorded and produced six songs with KRS-One for a mix tape "dissing" Nelly, after Nelly "dissed" KRS-One on BET's 106 & Park. Later that year, Big Chris founded his music studio and  production company, "The Rehab Studio," where he produced rock, pop reggae, Latin and urban tracks for television and film. As of today he has placed over eighty songs in various television shows, including MTV's Laguna Beach, The Hills, The City, The X Effect, and P Diddy's Making The Band.

In 2003, Big Chris Flores produced the opening song to an album by the Mo Thugs Family named "IV: The Movement", featuring Layzie Bone.  In 2005 Big Chris produced and mixed a Latin hip hop song, performed by Camilo "Tea Time" Castaldi named En La Calle, which was released on Machete Music's Hip Hop En Tu Idioma compilation album. That same year, Big Chris produced and mixed a reggae album, featuring top name reggae artists such as Prezident Brown, Luciano and Grammy award winner Yami Bolo.

In 2006, Big Chris produced and mixed a reggaeton song called Passion which was released in the movie Jarhead's DVD collector's edition. In 2007, Big Chris produced and mixed two songs for a Cedric the Entertainer and Lucy Liu movie called, Code Name: The Cleaner. That same year, Big Fish Audio released an audio DVD containing forty two tracks produced and mixed by Big Chris named Hip Hop Moodswings, for their catalog of production loops and sounds for producers to use. Hip Hop Moodswings was number one in the Big Fish catalog for more than two months.

In 2008, Big Chris produced and mixed a score written by Velvet Revolver guitarist/ex-Guns N' Roses guitarist Slash, for a movie called This is Not A Movie, which was released in Mexico and Europe in January 2011, and is soon to be released in the United States. Immediately after the music production of This is Not A Movie, Big Chris and Slash started pre-production on Slash's first self-titled solo album, where Big Chris did production throughout the album, along with Eric Valentine, Kid Rock and Kevin Churko, which included production, keyboards and programming on one of the hit singles featuring Fergie called Beautiful Dangerous.

Big Chris continues to record, produce and mix at his production studio in L.A. called The Rehab studio. Recent projects include Miss Bang Bang's single and music video Punch Drunk Loverfeaturing Slash acting as engineer for Rihanna's single, Rock Star 101 featuring Slash, as well as Bun B's album, Trill OG. He is also co-writing and producing songs with Jeff Foskett, among others.

Discography

References

External links 
 

Living people
1970 births
Musicians from California
Musicians Institute alumni